John Ivan "Hickey" Nicholson (September 9, 1911 – November 22, 1956) was a professional ice hockey player who played two games in the National Hockey League. Born Charlottetown, Prince Edward Island, he played with the Chicago Black Hawks.

External links

1911 births
1956 deaths
Canadian ice hockey left wingers
Canadian military personnel of World War II
Chicago Blackhawks players
Ice hockey people from Prince Edward Island
Sportspeople from Charlottetown